Goblet holder, or Bekerschroef refers to a specific type of wine glass extender used for ceremonial occasions in the Netherlands during the 16th and 17th centuries.

Many Dutch group portraits of guilds feature members holding one with a wine glass or rummer, in it. They were also often featured in still-life paintings, possibly to commemorate the banquet or feast of the holder.

References

Silver objects
Art of the Dutch Golden Age
Amsterdam Museum
Holders
Drinkware